Trygve Owren (7 October 1912 – 3 March 1987) was a Norwegian politician for the Conservative Party.

He was elected to the Norwegian Parliament from Oppland in 1965, but was not re-elected in 1969.  He had previously served in the position of deputy representative during the terms 1958–1961 and 1961–1965.  During his second term as a deputy, in September 1963, he replaced the deceased Guttorm Granum.

Owren was born in Fåberg and was involved in local politics in Fåberg and its successor municipality Lillehammer between 1954 and 1967.

References 
 

1912 births
1987 deaths
Conservative Party (Norway) politicians
Members of the Storting
20th-century Norwegian politicians